Unge Frustrerte Menn was a rock band from Bergen, Norway.

The band formed in 1991 and broke up in 2002. Their debut album, Slanger og Snegler, was released in 1991. Their last album, Solen Titter Frem – De Beste Sangene (2002), was a compilation album. Despite its break up, and the fact that the band has not released any new material since 2002, it reunites every year to host the traditional Christmas concert 2nd Christmdayas . At the 2009 concert, it was highlighted that this was the tenth consecutive year they had participated in this concert at the Ricks.

Discography 
 1991: Slanger og snegler (Sigma)
 1995: Doddo og Unge Frustrerte Menn (Tylden & Co.) 
 1996: Sosialantropologi (Lucky Music)
 1997: Hodet i sanden (Grappa) 
 1998: Øl og Peanøtter (Grappa)
 2000: Dronningen av Kalde Føtter (Grappa)
 2002: Solen titter frem – de beste sangene (Grappa)

Referanser

References

Musical groups established in 1991
Norwegian rock music groups